Henry Nevill, 6th and de jure 4th Baron Abergavenny KB (between 1527 and 153510 February 1587) was an English peer. He was the son of Sir George Nevill, 5th Baron Bergavenny, and Mary Stafford (daughter of Edward Stafford, 3rd Duke of Buckingham). He succeeded to the barony upon the death of his father, George Nevill, 5th Baron Bergavenny.

Biography

Henry, sixth (sometimes fourth) Lord Abergavenny, had summons to parliament on 23 January 1552, to 15 October 1586. He was one of the peers that sat in judgment on Mary, Queen of Scots, at Fotheringay. He died at his seat called Comfort, near Birling, Kent, on 10 February 1587.

He married first, Frances, daughter of Thomas Manners, 1st Earl of Rutland; he married secondly, Elizabeth, daughter of Stephen Darell, of Spelmonden, Kent (she remarried to Sir William Sedley, of Southfleet, Kent, Knt. and Bart.); by his first wife, he had an only daughter Mary Neville who married Sir Thomas Fane.

Wyatt's rebellion
During the Wyatt's rebellion of January–February 1554 Henry and Robert Southwell, the High Sheriff of Kent married to Henry's niece Margaret, led the loyalist forces against the rebels. According to D. M. Loades, "Sir Robert Southwell and Lord Abergavenny were almost the only significant gentlemen in the country whose loyalty was never in doubt"; "Southwell, Abergavenny and Cheney were the most active royalist leaders."

Henry and Southwell began recruitment of loyalist forces on 24 January, one day before the outbreak of the rebellion, although at this stage they had little success. On 26 January Wyatt declared Henry and Southwell "traitors to God, the Crown and the Commonwealth" for "stirring up the Queen's most loyal subjects of the realm." 

By 27 January, the loyalists's position improved, and their combined forces in Kent matched the numbers of Wyatt's force in Rochester, at around two thousand men on each side. Henry and Southwell with six hundred men blocked the road from Tonbridge to Rochester to prevent consolidation of the rebels. On 28 January Southwell defeated Henry Isley's company of rebels at Wrotham, taking around sixty prisoners. However, on the same day the army of Duke of Norfolk deserted to Wyatt; Henry and Southwell fled to London. Wyatt marched to London himself with around three thousand men, but lost the initiative; Southwell and Thomas Cheney managed to raise another loyalist company in his rear. On 4 February Henry and Southwell marched to Greenwich. Wyatt was cut off from his base in Kent, and could not count on reinforcements while the loyalists' forces gained strength every day. 

By 7 February, Wyatt's army disintegrated. Amongst Wyatt's supporters who were later sentenced to death was Thomas Fane, later Henry Nevill's son-in-law. Fane was pardoned due to his youth and he became a loyal supporter of the crown, a member of parliament and a son-in-law to Neville.

Mary, Lady Fane
His daughter, Mary Neville, Baroness le Despencer, died 28 June 1626, aged 72, buried at Mereworth, Kent, having married at Birling, 12 December 1574, as the second wife, to Thomas Fane, of Badsell, Kent Her son, Francis, was created Earl of Westmorland, knighted at Dover Castle, 26 August 1573, died 13 March 1589, will dated 12 March 1589, proved 10 February 1590.

Lady Fane claimed the barony of Abergavenny against Edward Nevill, the heir male upon whom the castle of Bergavenny was settled as aforesaid, and as a compromise, she was by letters patent, 25 May 1604, confirmed in the name, style, and dignity of Baroness le Despencer, to the heirs of her body, with the ancient seat, place, and precedence of her ancestors.

Ancestry

Notes

References
Froude, J. A. (1889). The Reign of Mary Tudor. 2008 reprint: Bibliobazaar LLC, .
Loades, D. M. (1965). The Two Tudor Conspiracies. Cambridge University Press.
Zell, Michael (2000). Early modern Kent, 1540–1640. Boydell & Brewer. .

16th-century births
1587 deaths
Knights of the Bath
Henry
Year of birth uncertain
16th-century English nobility
Barons Bergavenny (Peerage of England)
People from Birling, Kent